
Gmina Radzanów is a rural gmina (administrative district) in Mława County, Masovian Voivodeship, in east-central Poland.

Villages
Gmina Radzanów contains the villages and settlements of Bębnówko, Bębnowo, Bieżany, Bojanowo, Bońkowo Kościelne, Bońkowo-Podleśne, Budy-Matusy, Cegielnia Ratowska, Gradzanowo Włościańskie, Gradzanowo Zbęskie, Gradzanowo Zbęskie-Kolonia, Józefowo, Luszewo, Marysinek, Radzanów, Ratowo, Ratowo-Leśniczówka, Trzciniec, Wróblewo, Zgliczyn Witowy, Zgliczyn-Glinki and Zieluminek.

Neighbouring gminas
Gmina Radzanów is bordered by the gminas of Bieżuń, Raciąż, Siemiątkowo, Strzegowo and Szreńsk.

References

External links 
 Polish official population figures 2006

Radzanow
Mława County